Chickasaw is a city in Mobile County, Alabama, United States. As of the 2020 census the population was 6,457, up from 6,106 at the 2010 census. It is part of the Mobile metropolitan area.

History

Company town 

In the early 20th century before the city now standing was incorporated, the present site of Chickasaw was a company town, wholly owned by Chickasaw Shipyard and developed for its workers. The property was bought by Gulf Shipbuilding Corporation in 1940. It expanded with the defense buildup during World War II.

It attempted to restrict the activities of Jehovah's Witnesses, the subject of a case that reached the Supreme Court of the United States, Marsh v. Alabama, 326 U.S. 501 (1946). The court ruled that although the Chickasaw Shipyard Village was privately owned, because it functioned as a town open to the public, the right conferred on residents and visitors by the First Amendment to the United States Constitution cannot be abridged.

In 1946 the village was purchased by Leedy Investment Company. It renovated housing and offered it for sale to renters. Some former residents returned to the village and bought houses. It suffered from downturns in shipbuilding, which caused the loss of jobs.

Residents worked to have the village documented, and in 2004 the Chickasaw Shipyard Village Historic District was added to the National Register of Historic Places.

Geography
It is bordered to the east by the city of Mobile, to the south and west by Prichard, and to the north by Saraland. U.S. Route 43 (Telegraph Road and North Craft Highway) is the main road through Chickasaw, leading south  to downtown Mobile and north  to Jackson. Interstate 65 passes through the west side of Chickasaw, with access from Exit 10 (West Lee Street). I-65 leads south into Mobile and northeast  to Montgomery. 

Chickasaw Creek, a tidal arm of the Mobile River, forms the northeast border of the city. The Port of Chickasaw is in the eastern part of the city, on Chickasaw Creek.

Demographics

The city had its peak of population in 1960, when the shipyard was still operating at high capacity. Decline in shipyard jobs has resulted in a decline in overall population since then.

2000 census
As of the census of 2000, there were 6,364 people, 2,747 households, and 1,747 families living in the city. The racial makeup of the city was 88.89% White, 8.12% Black or African American, 1.35% Native American, 0.24% Asian, 0.02% Pacific Islander, 0.30% from other races, and 1.08% from two or more races. 1.15% of the population were Hispanic or Latino of any race.

There were 2,747 households, out of which 26.5% had children under the age of 18 living with them, 44.6% were married couples living together, 15.4% had a female householder with no husband present, and 36.4% were non-families. 32.9% of all households were made up of individuals, and 18.4% had someone living alone who was 65 years of age or older. The average household size was 2.31 and the average family size was 2.95.

In the city, the population dispersal was 23.6% under the age of 18, 8.5% from 18 to 24, 26.0% from 25 to 44, 20.3% from 45 to 64, and 21.5% who were 65 years of age or older. The median age was 39 years. For every 100 females, there were 86.3 males. For every 100 females age 18 and over, there were 79.0 males. The median income for a household in the city was $27,036, and the median income for a family was $33,125. Males had a median income of $29,074 versus $21,181 for females. The per capita income for the city was $14,190. About 13.0% of families and 17.1% of the population were below the poverty line, including 25.1% of those under age 18 and 13.9% of those age 65 or over.

2010 census
As of the census of 2010, there were 6,106 people, 2,430 households, and 1,612 families living in the city. The population density was 1,387,7 people per square mile (531.0 km2). The racial makeup of the city was 63.0% White, 33.6% Black or African American, .8% Native American, 0.5% Asian, 0.0% Pacific Islander, 0.9% from other races, and 1.2% from two or more races. 2.3% of the population were Hispanic or Latino of any race.

There were 2,430 households, out of which 29.2% had children under the age of 18 living with them, 39.2% were married couples living together, 22.6% had a female householder with no husband present, and 33.7% were non-families. 29.5% of all households were made up of individuals, and 12.5% had someone living alone who was 65 years of age or older. The average household size was 2.51 and the average family size was 3.12.

In the city, the population dispersal was 26.9% under the age of 18, 8.9% from 18 to 24, 25.2% from 25 to 44, 24.2% from 45 to 64, and 14.8% who were 65 years of age or older. The median age was 35.1 years. For every 100 females, there were 86.0 males. For every 100 females age 18 and over, there were 87.3 males.

The median income for a household in the city was $33,061, and the median income for a family was $40,625. Males had a median income of $35,300 versus $25,369 for females. The per capita income for the city was $18,105. About 18.9% of families and 20.7% of the population were below the poverty line, including 30.0% of those under age 18 and 11.0% of those age 65 or over. The median home price was an estimated $83,800 in 2010. The rent burden was 47.9%.

2020 census

As of the 2020 United States census, there were 6,457 people, 2,134 households, and 1,246 families residing in the city.

Education 
Chickasaw's public schools are within the Chickasaw City Schools district. The city voted in 2012 to form its own school system with Satsuma, Alabama, leaving that operated by Mobile County School Board.

History of schools
Chickasaw's public schools were previously operated by the Mobile County Public School System. Hamilton Elementary School was within the Chickasaw city limits and serves Chickasaw residents. In addition two magnet schools, the elementary Chickasaw School of Mathematics and Science and the Clark School of Mathematics, Science and Technology (high school), were in the city. Residents zoned to Hamilton are also zoned to Chastang Middle School.

Several years prior to 2009, officials of Chickasaw, Satsuma, and Saraland contemplated forming the "Delta School District." Around 2009 Chickasaw officials considered a plan to secede from the Mobile County school system, after Mobile County officials considered closing the Chickasaw magnets, which together have a combined total of 14% Chickasaw residents. The remainder of the students came from other locations, including the unincorporated area of Grand Bay. Mobile County considered moving the magnets to Shaw High School in western Mobile.

Chickasaw did separate from the Mobile County school system, effective in 2013, with the understanding that the elementary Chickasaw School of Mathematics and Science would be relocated from Chickasaw within four years. While it remained, the residents of Chickasaw were required to pay $2,200 per year per child in order to attend the school, as they were no longer part of the county system. In January 2013 the Mobile County school board decided to move the elementary Mathematics and Science school to the former Howard Elementary School near Downtown Mobile.

Notable person
Ray Sawyer of the band Dr. Hook and the Medicine Show was born in Chickasaw in 1937.

See also

 Bible Belt

References

External links
 

Cities in Alabama
Cities in Mobile County, Alabama
Company towns in Alabama
Alabama placenames of Native American origin